Magnet Cove High School (MCHS) is an accredited comprehensive public high school, with grades 9-12, in Magnet Cove, Arkansas, United States, with a Malvern post office address. It is one of three high schools with Malvern post office addresses, one of five public high schools in Hot Spring County and the sole high school administered by the Magnet Cove School District.

It is serving more than 300 students.

Academics 
Magnet Cove High School has been accredited by the Arkansas Department of Education (ADE) and has been accredited by AdvancED (formerly North Central Association) since 1986. The assumed course of study follows the Smart Core curriculum developed the ADE, which requires students to complete 22 credit units before graduation. Students engage in regular (core and career focus) courses and exams and may select Advanced Placement (AP) coursework and exams that provide an opportunity for college credit.

Athletics 
The Magnet Cove High School mascot is the Panther with school colors of black and orange.

For 2012–14, the Magnet Cove Panthers participate in various interscholastic activities in the 2A Classification from the 2A Region 5 Conference as administered by the Arkansas Activities Association. The school athletic activities include football, golf (boys/girls), cross country (boys/girls), basketball (boys/girls), cheer, baseball, softball and track and field (boys/girls).

References

External links 

 

Public high schools in Arkansas
Schools in Hot Spring County, Arkansas